Ennu Nathante Nimmi is a 1986 Indian Malayalam-language film, directed by Sajan and produced by P. T. Xavier. The film stars Mammootty, Rahman, Raadhu,  and Sukumari . The film has musical score by Shyam.

Cast
Mammooty as Mahesh
Rahman as Nathan
Raadhu as Nirmala
Baiju as Venkidi
Sukumari 
Lizy as Reena 
Mukesh as Sreeni
Thilakan as Chidambaram
Kunchan as Thomas
Mala Aravindan as Sayipp
Kaviyoor Ponnamma as Nirmala's grandmother
Mamukkoya as Fakrudeen
Tony Antony as Bose
Paravoor Bharathan 
N. L. Balakrishnan as Music director

Soundtrack
The music was composed by Shyam and the lyrics were written by Chunakkara Ramankutty.

References

External links
 

1986 films
1980s Malayalam-language films
Films directed by Sajan